The 1872 Bedfordshire by-election was fought on 27 June 1872.  The byelection was fought due to the Succession to a peerage of the incumbent MP of the Liberal Party, Francis Russell.  It was won by the Liberal candidate Francis Bassett.

References

1872 in England
1872 elections in the United Kingdom
By-elections to the Parliament of the United Kingdom in Bedfordshire constituencies
19th century in Bedfordshire